Copelatus mahleri is a species of diving beetle. It is part of the genus Copelatus, which is in the subfamily Copelatinae of the family Dytiscidae. It was described by Holmen & Vazirani in 1990.

References

mahleri
Beetles described in 1990